The 111th United States Congress began on January 3, 2009. There were nine new senators (seven Democrats, two Republicans) and 54 new representatives (32 Democrats, 22 Republicans), as well as two new delegates (one Democrat, one independent), at the start of its first session. Additionally, 12 senators (nine Democrats, three Republicans) and 11 representatives (seven Democrats, four Republicans) took office on various dates in order to fill vacancies during the 111th Congress before it ended on January 3, 2011.

The presidents of the House Democratic freshman class were Gerry Connolly of Virginia and Martin Heinrich of New Mexico, while the president of the House Republican freshman class was Steve Austria of Ohio.

Senate

Took office January 3, 2009

Took office during the 111th Congress

House of Representatives

Took office January 3, 2009

Non-voting delegates

Took office during the 111th Congress

See also 
 List of United States senators in the 111th Congress
 List of members of the United States House of Representatives in the 111th Congress by seniority

Notes

References

Freshman class members
111